Michael Magone (1845–1859) was an Italian adolescent student of Saint John Bosco. After making exceptional improvements in his behavior and character, he died due to a gastric hemorrhage at fourteen years of age.

Michael Magone was one of three students that Saint John Bosco considered to be a saint.  One student was the well known Saint Dominic Savio, while the other is the lesser known Francis Besucco.  A painting of the three students is found in St. Francis De Sales Church in Valdocco, Turin. His mother was Sarah Magone whereas his father was Niovani Magone, who was a dacoit.

Biography

First meeting with Saint John Bosco
Michael Magone was playing with a gang of boys inside the train station, when Saint John Bosco heard his distinctively authoritative voice and approached him.  After a brief discussion, Saint John Bosco realized that the boy had potential, but was vulnerable to crime in his current situation.  Having to quickly catch a train, he gave Michele Magone a medal and instructed him go to the assistant priest, Francesco Alberto Ariccio (1819-1884).

At the Oratory of St. Francis de Sales

Initial difficulties
Given his lively nature and previous rowdy and unbound life on the streets, Michael Magone was initially a disturbing element in the classroom.  In order to help him transition into an obedient student, a companion was assigned to him and asked to be his guardian angel.  Whenever Michael Magone would act inappropriately, his companion would correct him.  Although he was occasionally impatient with the corrections, he was grateful and would thank his friend

When Michael Magone came to the Oratory he had an immense desire to play outside with the other boys, but after about a month he suddenly became sad and evasive.  When questioned about his despondent mood, he expressed feeling inadequate in piety and lack of hope that he can improve.  His companion convinced him that speaking with his confessor would help clear his conscience.  Following confession he was overwhelmed by relief and became filled with happiness.  From then on he went to confession and communion frequently and began to enjoy practices of

The Life of Michael Magone
Saint John Bosco was inspired by Michael Magone and wrote a book about him, The Life of Michael Magone.

References

External links

Biographies

The Life of Michele Magone, by St. John Bosco available freely on-line at the  http://salesians.org.au website.

1845 births
1859 deaths
19th-century Italian people
Italian saints
Italian Roman Catholics